Fabián Ariel Noguera (born 20 March 1993) is an Argentine footballer who plays as a centre-back for Estudiantes de La Plata.

Club career

Banfield
Born in Ramos Mejía, La Matanza, Buenos Aires Province, Noguera finished his formation with Banfield. After the club's relegation to Primera B Nacional in 2012, he was promoted to the first team.

On 23 October 2012, Noguera made his professional debut, starting and scoring his team's only in a 1–2 away loss against Gimnasia Jujuy. On 9 February of the following year, he scored a brace in a 2–0 home win against the same team.

Noguera scored seven goals during the campaign, as his side narrowly missed out promotion. After being an undisputed starter in 2013–14, contributing with 38 appearances and three goals as his side finally returned to Primera División.

Noguera made his debut in the main category of Argentine football on 8 August 2014, starting in a 0–3 loss at Godoy Cruz. He scored his first goal in the division on 10 May of the following year, netting the last in a 3–0 away win against Aldosivi.

Santos
On 21 February 2016, as his contract was due to expire, Noguera reached an agreement with Série A club Santos, with the deal being effective in May. On 5 July he signed a contract until June 2021 with the club, being officially presented a day later.

Noguera made his unofficial debut for the club on 8 October 2016, coming on as a first half substitute for Luiz Felipe and scoring his side's only in a 1–1 friendly draw against Benfica. He made his Série A debut five days later, coming on as a late substitute for Renato in a 1–0 away win against São Paulo.

Noguera scored his first official goal for Peixe on 16 October 2016, netting the equalizer in a 1–1 home draw against Grêmio. He made his Copa Libertadores debut the following 5 July, replacing Kayke in a 3–2 away win against Atlético Paranaense.

On 8 January 2021, after his loan spells, Noguera terminated his contract with Santos.

Estudiantes (loan)
On 23 January 2018, Noguera was loaned to Estudiantes for one year, with a buyout clause.

Gimnàstic (loan)
On 22 January 2019, Noguera moved to Spanish Segunda División side Gimnàstic de Tarragona, on loan until the end of the season. He became an immediate first-choice at the club, but suffered relegation.

Ponferradina (loan)
On 21 August 2019, Noguera agreed to a one-year loan deal with SD Ponferradina, still in the Spanish second division.

Career statistics

References

External links
 
 
 
 
 
 

1993 births
Living people
People from Ramos Mejía
Argentine footballers
Argentine expatriate footballers
Association football defenders
Club Atlético Banfield footballers
Estudiantes de La Plata footballers
Santos FC players
Gimnàstic de Tarragona footballers
SD Ponferradina players
Argentine Primera División players
Primera Nacional players
Campeonato Brasileiro Série A players
Segunda División players
Argentine expatriate sportspeople in Brazil
Argentine expatriate sportspeople in Spain
Expatriate footballers in Brazil
Expatriate footballers in Spain
Sportspeople from Buenos Aires Province